Tumucumaque can refer to:

 The Tumuk Humak Mountains, also known as the Sierra Tumucumaque
 The Tumuk Humak Uplands of the Guiana Shield
 Tumucumaque Mountains National Park, Brazil's largest national park
 codename for Mozilla Firefox 4 web browser